Tebua Tarawa was an island of the Republic of Kiribati. It was part of the Tarawa Atoll, which is part of the main chain of islands. It originally was popular with fishermen. In the 1990s, rising seas posed a threat to it. It remained uninhabited when it disappeared in 1999, along with the island Abanuea.

References 

Islands of Kiribati
Former islands